The 2010–11 Marshall Thundering Herd men's basketball team represented Marshall University during the 2010–11 NCAA Division I men's basketball season as a member of Conference USA (C-USA). They played their home games at the Cam Henderson Center and were led by first year head coach Tom Herrion.

Roster

Schedule 

|-
!colspan=9 style=| Exhibition

|-
!colspan=9 style=| Regular Season

|-

|-

|-

|-
!colspan=9 style=| C-USA Tournament

|-
!colspan=9 style=| CIT

Source

References

Marshall Thundering Herd men's basketball seasons
Marshall
Marshall
Marsh
Marsh